The Oldershaw O-2, officially registered as the Oldershaw Jana-Linn O-2, is an American high-wing, single seat, V-tailed glider that was designed and built by Vernon Oldershaw.

Design and development
The O-2 was designed by Oldershaw to compete with Dick Johnson's Ross-Johnson RJ-5.

The O-2 is constructed of wood. Its  span wing employs a NACA 63 (3)-618 airfoil at the wing root, with a NACA 63 (2)-615 at the wing tip. The wing is equipped with dive brakes. The landing gear is a retractable monowheel.

Only one O-2 was built.

Operational history
The O-2 first flew in 1961 and was flown by Oldershaw in the 1962 and 1962 US Nationals. Oldershaw later sold the aircraft to Don Gaede of Torrance, California and it was reportedly still being actively flown in the 1980s. Gaede remodeled the cockpit and introduced a new nose shape. The O-2 was later donated to the US Southwest Soaring Museum, where it is on display.

Aircraft on display
US Southwest Soaring Museum

Specifications (O-2)

See also

References

External links
The O-2 on the cover of Soaring magazine, December 1961

1960s United States sailplanes
Homebuilt aircraft
Aircraft first flown in 1961
V-tail aircraft
High-wing aircraft